Abdul Wahid Mohamed al Nur (also Abdel Wahid el-Nur or Abdulwahid Mohammed Nour; , ʿAbd al-Wāḥid Muḥammad Nūr; born in 1968) is the leader of the rebel Sudan Liberation Movement (al Nur) faction. 

Born in Zalingei, West Darfur, he was educated at the University of Khartoum, where he graduated in 1995 with a law degree before working as a lawyer. In June 1992, al Nur and others at the University of Khartoum created the Sudan Liberation Movement to liberate Sudan from Islamic National Front.

Life

Abdul Wahid Mohamed al Nur is a lawyer, born in 1968 in Zalingei, Darfur, Sudan. He is a founder of the SLM in 1992, in response to the violence perpetrated by the dictatorship of Gen. Omar al-Bashir, which National Islamic Front had seized power three years earlier in a military coup and immediately engaged in a brutal jihad against the African population in South Sudan, in the Blue Nile and Nuba Mountains regions, resulting in massive murders, thousands of villages destructed, and millions internally displaced people (IDP).
The crimes are committed by the GOS (Government of Sudan) Arab militias, the Janjaweeds, supported by the regular army. Omar el Bashir and two of his ministers have been indicted at the ICC (International Criminal Court in Hague, Netherlands) for mass murder, crimes against humanity and genocide.

He expressed officially, and widely, both in the Arab and Western media, his vision which is to establish a secular liberal democratic and federal Sudan, where religion will be separated from the state, and the state will establish strong relationships with Israel (every weekly speech since 2007 and until today in 2020).

This has been widely published on Reuters, AFP, Wall Street Journal, but also on Arab media (many interviews on Al Djazira, articles on Sudan Tribune and all the Arab media). Because of this stance, the people of Sudan came to realize that islam radicalism is a radical enemy of Africans, while Israel could be a stable ally to secure all the region.

Abdul Wahid Mohamed al Nur did not make these statements to obtain the removal of US sanctions, he is not like General BURHAN, Sudanese Chairman of the Transitional Military Council, who supported Omar el Bashir for three decades and decided tactically to tie links with Israel.

He made these statements at a time it was considered a crime in Sudan, and he paid the heavy price of blood as Omar el Bashir and General Burhan, in return, ordered the destruction of 5000 villages in Darfur, the mass killing and deportation of half a million people. Yet, M. EL NUR did not change his speech in favour of Israel, in return he made it even stronger and developed it all over Sudan.

Al Nur did cooperate with the ICC and provided elements which led to the indictment of Omar el Bashir and several of his officers.
He has been in contact with Fatou Bensouda, International Criminal Court's chief prosecutor since June 2012, after having served as a Deputy Prosecutor in charge of the Prosecutions Division of the ICC since 2004 and having been minister of justice of Gambia. Abdul Wahid Mohamed al Nur is in favour of empowering the ICC, yet he disagrees with the potential indictment of the State of Israel and uses his influence on the ICC to block it.

Notes

External links
Abdel Wahid Al-Nur, "Why We Won't Talk to Sudan's Islamo-Fascists", The Wall Street Journal, June 18, 2008 
"SLM statement on the secular state", by al Nur
 Video: Al Nur Supports Relations with Israel: "An Israeli Embassy in Khartoum Will Serve the Interests of the Sudanese People".
 The SLM should take power in Sudan 

1968 births
Living people
Sudanese rebels
University of Khartoum alumni